Glenden is a mining town and rural locality in the Isaac Region, Queensland, Australia. 

In the  the locality of Glenden had a population of 620 people., but the population has since declined rapidly, since the local mine changed its roster to a seven-days-on, seven-days-off roster, and is expected to continue to do so. Many residents are relocating to towns like Proserpine that offer a more stable environment.

History
Glenden was constructed by the Mount Isa Mines company (now Glencore) to provide accommodation for workers at their Newlands coal mine. The site, 30 kilometres from the mine, was chosen in 1981 and was constructed by the company and then given to the Shire of Nebo (which was amalgamated in 2008 to become Isaac Region) to administer.

Glenden State School opened on 25 January 1982.

Glenden Post Office opened circa 1983.

Glenden Christian School opened on 5 January 1995 but closed on 3 February 1997.

In the 2011 census, Glenden had a population of 1,308 people.

In the  the locality of Glenden had a population of 620 people.

Economy
The mine is the major employer in the town. The surrounding rural areas are mostly cattle grazing stations.

Education
Glenden State School is a government primary and secondary (Prep-12) school for boys and girls at Gillham Terrace. In 2013, the school had 317 students and 25 teachers (24 full-time equivalent). In 2018, the school had an enrolment of 91 students with 15 teachers (14 full-time equivalent) and 12 non-teaching staff (8 full-time equivalent).

Facilities 
Glenden Police Station is at 8 Bell Place.

Glenden Fire Station is at 2 Bell Place.

Glenden Primary Health Care Centre is at 4 Bell Place. Glenden Ambulance Station is also located there.

Glenden Water Treatment Plant is on Usher the south-west of the town . Glenden SES Facility is within the water treatment site on the south-east corner on Usher Street.

Amenities 
The Isaac Regional Council operates a public library in Glenden Shopping Centre in the Town Centre on Ewan Drive. The council also operates the Glenden Recreation Centre in the Town Centre. It also provides tennis and basketball courts off Bell Place, the Maddern Oval on Gilbert Avenue, and the Glenden Swimming Pool at 21 Bell Place.

St Paul's Anglican and Catholic Church is on the western corner of Perry Drive and Bell Place.

Glenden Golf Club is an 18-hole golf course at the end of Golf Club Road.

References

External links
 

Isaac Region
Localities in Queensland